Mount Adaklu is a mountain situated 12 km from Ho in the Volta Region of Ghana. It is one of the highest in Ghana at about 580 m above sea level and is venerated by the inhabitants of nearby villages of the Ewe ethnic group. The mountain is surrounded by nine villages, some of which are Helekpe, Avanyaviwofe, Goefe, Sikama, Abuadi, and Kordiabe. Kordiabe is located about a quarter way up the mountain, and is a convenient resting place when climbing the mountain from the Helekpe path.

Tours are organized of the mountain for tourists, and the profits derived from them are invested in the community. A three-hour hike to the summit is a good opportunity to see colorful birds and butterflies.

Directly below the summit is the village of Helekpe, which provides hospitality, with a guest house and guides who lead tours to the summit of Adaklu and show and explain aspects of local life in the countryside.  While most people in the village speak the local language of Ewe, there are many that understand and can communicate in English as well. 

Adaklu is noted for its wild bees, palm wine and local gin, better known as akpeteshie.

Three kilometers from the foot of the mountain is the Kalakpa Resource Reserve. Local fauna include kob, African Buffalo, harnessed bushbuck, olive baboon, hooded vulture, pied crow, rainbow agama and many other species.

References

Adaklu